Fourteen Locks  is a series of locks, also known as the Cefn Flight, on the Crumlin arm of the Monmouthshire Canal at Rogerstone in Newport, South Wales. The flight of locks was completed in 1799 and raises the water level 160 ft (50 m) in just 800 yd (740 m). This is one of the steepest rises for a major run in the UK which, combined with the sheer number of locks,  makes it one of the most significant in the country. The run of locks includes a series of embanked ponds, pounds, sluices and weirs to control the water supply, with no set of gates shared between individual locks. It therefore comprises a flight of locks rather than a lock staircase.

History
The Monmouthshire Canal was authorised by an Act of Parliament obtained in June 1792, and consisted of a main line from Newport to Pontnewynydd, which would eventually join up with the Brecon and Abergavenny Canal once that was built, and a branch running from Crindai, now called Malpas, to Crumlin. Both sections were heavily locked, the main line rising  through 41 locks, and the branch rising  through 32 locks. The Rogerstone flight on the Crumlin Branch had the largest number of locks. The branch also had seven at Aber-carn and five at Allt-yr-ynn. Thomas Dadford, Jr. was appointed as the engineer for the project, although he was also working on the Glamorganshire Canal and the Leominster Canal at the time. The canal opened in phases, and by the time the main line opened in February 1796, most of the Crumlin Branch was finished apart from the  section from Rogerstone to Allt-yr-ynn, which included the lock flight. The company officially announced that the work was complete in April 1799.

Dadford worked on the project until 1798, and the Rogestone Locks were one of his major achievements. The problem of the closeness of the locks, and the consequent small pounds between them was overcome by the addition of side ponds, which minimise changes in level when a lock of water is added to the pound or removed from it. Because the canal was isolated from the main British canal network, Dadford was able to choose the size of the locks. Dadford succeeded in scaling the slope by grouping the locks, which are arranged as five pairs, and a group of three (numbers 10, 11 and 12), with lock 21 on its own.

The Monmouthshire Canal was always part of a network, most of which consisted of tram roads, many of which were owned and built by the company. The network was extended and converted for working by locomotives, so that by 1865, when the Monmouthshire company bought the Brecon and Abergavenny Canal, the canal was little used, and the amalgamation enabled them to carry more goods by rail. From 1880, the canal became part of the Great Western Railway company, who closed a short section of the branch at Crumlin in 1909, with the rest being closed by the British Transport Commission Act, passed in 1949 after the nationalisation of the canals in 1948. In the following year, Edwards wrote that the locks were inoperable, and that the canal was so choked with weed that it was scarcely canoeable.

Restoration 
Restoration of the Brecon and Abergavenny Canal began in 1961, as part of the creation of the Brecon Beacons National Park, but attention did not focus on the Monmouthshire Canal until 1965, when the Inland Waterways Association formed a South Wales section, after Cwmbran Council wanted to turn the section in their jurisdiction into water gardens and play parks. The group began campaigning for the protection of the remains. Two years later, the Newport (Monmouthshire) Canal Society was formed to push for restoration, and in 1968, anglers formed the Risca, Magor and St Mellons Canal Preservation Society, and the first volunteer work party on the Crumlin Branch took place in March 1969.

The first reconstruction work on the flight was in early 2003, when Cefn Lock was repaired. This enabled a trip-boat to be run on that small section.
For a considerable time only the top lock was in water. The pound above Lock 21 (Top lock) suffers from an intermittent water supply. This caused problems for the volunteers of the Mon & Brec Canals Trust, who ran boat trips through the lock on several occasions between 2004 and 2006.

On 23 March 2007, a grant for £700,000 was received from the Heritage Lottery Fund, following a joint presentation by Newport City Council and the Canals Trust. This was to allow restoration of the next four locks at the top of the flight. Work on locks 20, 19, 18 and 17 started in 2010 and was completed in 2011.

The Fourteen Locks Canal and Conference Centre is next to the pound below the top lock and includes exhibits about the canal, changing displays of local art, a meeting room and a tea room.  Guided walks along the canal are offered by the centre. In the first three years of operation, the centre attracted 150,000 visitors.

Bibliography

References

External links

 Fourteen Locks Official Site
 Newport City Council Guide 
 The Monmouthshire, Brecon & Abergavenny Canals Trust. Includes photograph of restoration work.
 Video footage and narration on the 14 Locks

Buildings and structures in Newport, Wales
Canals in Wales
History of Monmouthshire
History of Newport, Wales
Locks of Wales
Culture in Newport, Wales
Museums in Newport, Wales
Canal museums in the United Kingdom
Tourist attractions in Newport, Wales
Landmarks in Newport, Wales